Rocard is a submarine volcano in French Polynesia, located between the island of Mehetia and the Teahitia seamount. The volcano's summit is 2515m below sealevel. It has erupted in March 1966, September 1971, and July 1972.

The volcano was first located in 1976 using seismograph records, and its existence confirmed by a bathymetric survey.

In 2011 and 2013, seismic records suggested shallow magma outpouring from the volcano.

References

Volcanoes of French Polynesia
Active volcanoes
Submarine volcanoes
Seamounts of the Pacific Ocean
Hotspot volcanoes